The Ford C170 Platform is Ford's compact car automobile platform from the late 1990s used by the international Ford Focus through its first generation (succeeded by the Ford C1 platform in 2004 outside North America) and continued in use by the North American Ford Focus until 2011 and the Ford Transit Connect until 2013.

C170